The Chevrolet Menlo (畅巡) is an electric compact wagon/CUV, sold exclusively in China.  It is the first Chevrolet EV available in China.

History

The Chevrolet Menlo is based on the Chevrolet FNR-X concept shown at the 2017 Auto Shanghai show.  The production version of the Menlo debuted at a gala event in Hefei, Anhui on November 8, 2019, and was also shown at the 2019 Auto Guangzhou show.  Pre-ordering began in December, and deliveries started on February 20, 2020.

The Chinese government subsidy of up to 100,000 yuan (approximately US$14,250), the Menlo is the lowest-priced compact electric crossover in China.

Unlike the rest of the Chevrolet's models, the Menlo has a unique trim level naming scheme, which includes Starshare, Galaxy, Nebula and Starlux. It also features three driving modes (standard, sport, and economy) and three levels of energy recycling.

Powertrain

This battery is also used in the Buick Velite 6 Plus.

See also 
Chevrolet Bolt
List of modern production plug-in electric vehicles
New energy vehicles in China
Plug-in electric vehicle

References

External links

  

Menlo
Production electric cars
Cars introduced in 2019
2020s cars
Compact cars
Hatchbacks
Cars of China